The 2013 Amstel Curaçao Race was the 12th edition of the Amstel Curaçao Race and takes place on Curaçao, an island off the Venezuelan coast, on 2 November 2013. It is the only road bicycle race in which men and women compete against each other in the same race.

Results

External links
 Official Website

References

Amstel Curaçao Race
2013 in Curaçao
2013 in women's road cycling
2013 in men's road cycling
2013 in road cycling
November 2013 sports events in South America